Kobelevsky is a rural locality (a khutor) in Bolshezhirovsky Selsoviet Rural Settlement, Fatezhsky District, Kursk Oblast, Russia. Population:

Geography 
The khutor is located on the Nikovets Brook (a right tributary of the Ruda in the basin of the Svapa), 91.5 km from the Russia–Ukraine border, 32.5 km north-west of Kursk, 17.5 km south-west of the district center – the town Fatezh, 10.5 km from the selsoviet center – Bolshoye Zhirovo.

 Climate
Kobelevsky has a warm-summer humid continental climate (Dfb in the Köppen climate classification).

Transport 
Kobelevsky is located 10 km from the federal route  Crimea Highway as part of the European route E105, 32 km from the road of regional importance  (Kursk – Ponyri), 13 km from the road  (Fatezh – 38K-018), 1.5 km from the road of intermunicipal significance  (M2 "Crimea Highway" – Kromskaya), 31.5 km from the nearest railway halt 433 km (railway line Lgov I — Kursk).

The rural locality is situated 37 km from Kursk Vostochny Airport, 151 km from Belgorod International Airport and 235 km from Voronezh Peter the Great Airport.

References

Notes

Sources

Rural localities in Fatezhsky District